The PZL M28 Skytruck is a Polish STOL light cargo and passenger plane, produced by PZL Mielec, as a development of licence-built Antonov An-28s. Early licence-built planes were designated PZL An-28. The maritime patrol and reconnaissance variants are named PZL M28B Bryza ("sea breeze").

Development

The Antonov An-28 was the winner of a competition against the Beriev Be-30 for a new light passenger and utility transport for Aeroflot's short haul routes, conceived to replace the highly successful An-2 biplane. The An-28 is derived from the earlier An-14. Commonalities with the An-14 include a high wing layout, twin fins and rudders, but it differs in having a reworked and longer fuselage, with turboprop engines. The original powerplant was the TVD-850, but production versions are powered by the more powerful TVD-10B, with three-blade propellers.

The An-28 made its first flight as the An-14M in September 1969 in the USSR. A subsequent preproduction aircraft first flew in April 1975. Production of the An-28 was then transferred to Poland's PZL Mielec in 1978, although it was not until 22 July 1984 that the first Polish-built production aircraft flew. The An-28's Soviet type certificate was awarded in April 1986.

PZL Mielec has become the sole source for production An-28s. The basic variant, not differing from the Soviet one, was designated PZL An-28 and was powered with PZL-10S (licence-built TVD-10B) engines. They were built mostly for the USSR, until it broke up. The plane was next developed by the PZL Mielec into a westernised version powered by 820 kW (1100shp) Pratt & Whitney PT6A-65B turboprops with five-blade Hartzell propellers, plus some western (BendixKing) avionics (a distinguishing feature are exhaust pipes, sticking out on sides of engine nacelles). Designated the PZL M28 Skytruck, the first flight was on 24 July 1993 and it is in limited production, mostly for export (39 produced by 2006). The type received Polish certification in March 1996, and US FAR Part 23 certificate on 19 March 2004.

Apart from the Skytruck, PZL Mielec developed a family of militarized light transport and maritime reconnaissance planes for the Polish Air Force and Polish Navy in the 1990s, with original PZL-10S engines, named PZL M28B in the Air Force and Bryza in the Navy. From 2000, newly produced M28Bs started to be equipped with five-blade propellers as well.

PZL Mielec was bought by Sikorsky in 2007. Purchased primarily to produce helicopter structures, the company also produces 10 M28s per year. Sikorsky's current owner, Lockheed Martin, has marketed it to the governments of Indonesia, Jordan, Poland, Venezuela, Vietnam, the U.S. and commercial operators. Split equally between commercial and military applications, it competes with the Viking Air Twin Otter, the Let 410 and the Dornier 228.

Design

The M28 is a twin-engined high-wing strutted monoplane with an all-metal airframe, twin vertical fins and a tricycle fixed landing gear.
If an engine fails, a spoiler forward of the aileron opens automatically on the opposite wing.
This limits the wing drop to 12° in five seconds instead of 30°.

It is capable of Short takeoff & landing (STOL) and hot and high altitude operations.
Inlet air ducts inertial separators and inverted configuration of the PT6 and the high wing configuration protect the engines and propellers against foreign object damage for unprepared runways operations.

Multiple configurations are available: a 19-passenger airliner with 2-1 seating and an underbelly luggage pod; a cargo aircraft with a  hand-cranked hoist option; the most common combi; a VIP transport; a medevac for six litters and seven seats; a search-and-rescue version; a 17-seat paratrooper drop version; an 18-passenger utility cabin and an aerial firefighting version is considered. A crew of two can switch between passenger and cargo configurations in 7 min. Its inward opening rear doors allow for cargo drops and utility operations as well as the passenger boarding.

Operational history
176 An-28s and M28s in all variants were built in Poland by 2006. Most numerous users are former Soviet civil aviation and the Polish Air Force and Navy (about 25 as of 2006), smaller numbers are used by the Polish civil aviation and in the United States, Nepal, Colombia, Venezuela, Vietnam and Indonesia.

On 4 November 2005, a Vietnamese Airforce M28 crashed in Gia Lam district, Hanoi. All three crewmembers were killed.

On 12 February 2009, The weekly periodical Air Force Times reported that the Air Force Special Operations Command (AFSOC) would receive 10 PZL M28 Skytrucks in June 2009. These aircraft carry the U.S. Air Force model design series (MDS) designation of C-145A Skytruck. In 2011 one aircraft crash landed in Afghanistan and was damaged beyond repair. 11 of AFSOC's C-145As were retired in 2015. In 2016, three were sent to Kenya, two to Costa Rica, two to Nepal, and two to Estonia.

On 15 December 2022, the 711th Special Operations Squadron retired the C-145A from U.S. service.

Variants

Airframe variants
PZL An-28
Original variant, built under Antonov licence, with PZL-10S (licensed TV-10B) engines.
PZL M28 Skytruck
Development variant with redesigned fuselage and wings, new Pratt & Whitney Canada engines, new (western) avionics, 5-blade rotors, and some other minor changes.
PZL M28B Bryza
Militarized variants used by Polish Air Force and Polish Navy, similar to Skytruck, but with PZL-10S engines. Uses partially retracting landing gear to avoid interfering with its radar.
PZL M28+ Skytruck Plus
Prototype of new lengthened variant with more internal space, not in production.
C-145A
Variant flown by USAF Special Operations Warfare Center. Similar to Skytruck, but with Pratt and Whitney PT6A-65B Turboprops. The USAF has started retiring the aircraft, with the first aircraft, AF Ser. No. 08-0310, delivered to the 309th Aerospace Maintenance and Regeneration Group at Davis-Monthan AFB, Arizona on 28 May 2015. By June 2015 eleven out of 16 aircraft were stored.
MC-145B Wily Coyote
In May 2021, the U.S. Special Operations Command (SOCOM) awarded a contract to Sierra Nevada Corporation (SNC) to demonstrate the MC-145B as part of the Armed Overwatch program, which is seeking to acquire a new manned light attack aircraft to support U.S. special operations forces in permissive environments. Renderings of the proposed aircraft depict a pair of sensor turrets (one under the nose and the other under the fuselage) as well as a pair of underwing hardpoints on each side (total four) outboard of the wing struts. Internally, eight reloadable Common Launch Tubes (CLT) are provided as well as a ramp-launch capability.

Variants in use by Polish military

PZL An-28TD
Basic transport variant. Used mainly for transport and paratroop training (2 built).
PZL M28B
Several similar improved transport variants featuring avionics and airframe upgrades: Bryza 1TD (2 built), M28B (3 built), M28B Salon (1 built), M28B TDII, TDIII and TDIV (2 built of each).
PZL M28B Bryza 1R
Maritime patrol and reconnaissance variant (equipped with: 360° Search and Surveillance Radar ASR-400, Link-11 datalink). Used mainly for sea border patrolling, search and rescue operations and protection of the national economical sea zone (7 built).
PZL M28B Bryza 1E skydiving

Maritime ecological reconnaissance and patrol variant (2 built).
PZL M28B Bryza 1RM bis
Maritime patrol and reconnaissance variant with submarine detection capability, of 2004 (equipped with: 360° Search and Surveillance Radar ARS-800-2, ejection of single-use hydro-acoustic sonobuoys, Thermal Imaging System (FLIR), magnetic anomaly detector, Link-11 datalink). Used mainly for sea border patrolling, search and rescue operations and protection of the national economical sea zone (1 built as of 2006).
PZL M28 05 Skytruck
Maritime patrol and SAR variant for the Polish Border Guard, of 2006 (equipped with Search and Surveillance Radar ARS-400M and FLIR system) (1 built as of 2006).

Operators

Civil operators

PD Sicherheit, German defense training contractor, received three aircraft in 2019.

JAGS Aviation Guyana operates one aircraft.

Indonesian National Police operates four aircraft.

Sierra Nevada Corporation operates two aircraft.
Arizona Department of Public Safety operates two aircraft.

Military operators

Accidents and incidents
 On 28 October 2010, an Indonesian Police-operated M28 crashed in the Nabire region of the Indonesian state of Papua, killing five people.
 On 3 December 2016, a PZL Skytruck belonging to the Indonesian National Police crashed into the ocean in Dabo, Riau Islands while carrying 13 people. All 13 people on board were killed in the accident. Eyewitnesses stated that the aircraft had suffered an in-flight failure and claimed that the engine of the plane was emitting black smoke.
 On 30 May 2017, a PZL Skytruck belonging to the Nepal Army with registration NA-048 crashed at Bajura-based Kolti airport while its pilot was trying to land the aircraft. The cargo airplane was supposed to land on the Simikot airport in Humla district. However, bad weather condition forced the pilot to divert towards Bajura. The pilot of the aircraft died while two others were injured.

Specifications (PZL M28)

See also

References

External links

 PZL M28 aircraft dedicated website
 List of all PZL M28 aircraft used by Polish Air Force
 An-28/M28/M28B production list

1980s Polish military utility aircraft
Poland–Soviet Union relations
M28
Aircraft first flown in 1984
STOL aircraft
High-wing aircraft
Twin-turboprop tractor aircraft
Twin-tail aircraft